Harry Adriaans (born 17 March 1938) is a Dutch retired association football player who played for PSV Eindhoven as a midfielder from 1956 to 1957.

Footnotes

1938 births
Dutch footballers
Association football midfielders
Living people
PSV Eindhoven players